Hereford Cathedral Junior School is an independent, co-educational day school for children aged from three to eleven years. The Junior School is part of the Hereford Cathedral Foundation and has been under the aegis of the governors of Hereford Cathedral School since 1987.

History
The Junior School was founded in 1898 as a separate preparatory school for boys and moved to its present site in 1925. Since being redesignated as a junior school after it was acquired by Hereford Cathedral School, the Junior School has admitted girls and expanded its pupil numbers and its premises. It now provides a continuous education for boys and girls between the ages of two and eleven. Both schools now share the same governors.

The school occupies a number of historic and unusual buildings ranging from the Grade two star listed No. 28 and the ancient 14th century "Hall of the Vicars Choral" right up to the 21st century RIBA award winning Moat, which houses the Pre-Prep department.

Location
Hereford Cathedral Junior School is, like the Senior School, located in Castle Street in the city of Hereford. It occupies an assortment of Medieval and Georgian buildings, and shares sports grounds (Wyeside) with the Senior School.

References

External links
2009 Inspection Report

Preparatory schools in Herefordshire
Educational institutions established in 1898
Cathedral schools
1898 establishments in England
Church of England private schools in the Diocese of Hereford
Schools in Hereford